Sainik School, Purulia is a Sainik School (military school) established by the Sainik Schools Society in 1962, at Purulia, near Manguria in Purulia district, West Bengal India. The school prepares its students for the officers cadre in the Armed Forces and for other professions.

Background
Sainik School, Purulia is a residential school providing public school education, established on 29 January 1962. The school started to function at Bongabari, near Chharra in Purulia District.

Campus
The Sainik School campus is located away from hustle & bustle of the city life on an area of about 280 acre on Purulia-Ranchi road. Sainik School Purulia is well connected with the different parts of the country both by Rail & Road. The school is 5 km from Purulia Bus Stand and 8 km from Purulia Junction railway station. The school has a helipad of its own.

Extracurricular activities
Clubs for the students include English, Bengali, Hindi, Literary & Editorial club, Physics, Chemistry, Maths, Biology, Computers, Geography, Social Service, Library, Art, Craft, Dramatics & music, Astronomy, Photography, Nature Study, Yoga etc.

Admission
Boys are admitted to Class Six and Nine. An All India Sainik Schools Entrance Examination is held annually, usually in February. There is a 25% quota for defence candidates, and 15% and 7.5% respectively to SC and ST candidates. 33% may come from other states than West Bengal. The school terms are from 1 April to 31 March.

Vacations
Cadets are provided with 70 days official vacations.

Scholarship
The State Government awards few scholarships on merit-cum-means basis. In the case of those getting a full scholarship, fees in full, together with clothing and money are paid by the Government. However, the parents' income criteria are very stringent and very few people actually qualify for those slabs. For many students, particularly from other states, there is no scholarship available. Ministry of defence provides scholarship to the wards of serving/ retired JCOs and NCOs. In addition to it, all the cadets are also provided Central assistance

Management
The Sainik Schools are managed by a Society named Sainik School Society  which is registered under the Societies Registration Act (XXI of 1860). A Board of Governors that functions under the Chairmanship of the Defence Minister, is the Chief Executive Body of the Sainik Schools Society. The Board of Governors meets at least once a year. The school has a Local Board of Administration for overseeing the functioning of the school and its finances.

The Chief Minister or the Education Minister of the state are among the members of the Board of Governors. An officer of the Ministry of Defence is nominated to supervise and co-ordinate the functioning of the school and functions as the Honorary Secretary of the Sainik Schools Society. The Honorary Secretary is assisted by officers and staff of the Ministry of Defence. This includes two inspecting officers of the rank of Colonel or equivalent.

Notable people
The first Principal was Lt. Col. S Mazumdar. Col Pala Ram was a legendary headmaster during the mid 1990s. Some of the renowned teachers include Mr. Tarapada Das, (Late) Mr. Dilip Kumar Sinha, Mr. Ajit Kumar Saha and Mr. Bir Bhanu Giri, all awarded President of India National Award for Teachers (India). Among the alumni many have done work of national and international importance. Mr. S.B. Ganguly is the first winner of the SSP SWIFT Teaching Excellence Award. Murli Manohar Kumar is the first Joydeep Chatterjee Scholar, an award started in the memory of Late Capt Chatterjee by alumni from different batches. Abhishek Kumar Roy is the first Priyanath Mukhopadhyay Scholar. Shubham Kumar Singh is the first winner of Lt (IN) Deb Shankar Mitra Scholarship, an award started in the memory of Late Lt Deb Shankar Mitra. Divyajeet Chaudhary and Abhijeet Sadhu are the inaugural winners of Class of 1993 scholarship for the best all rounder in class XI and XII respectively.

Lt Gen Subrata Saha, PVSM UYSM YSM VSM** of the 1974 batch, rose to become the Deputy Chief of Army Staff. He is the first from the School to achieve the Lt Gen rank. He has the distinction of being GOC 15 Corps in Kashmir. He was successful in executing the brilliant rescue and relief operations during the floods in Kashmir 2014 and the much acclaimed security during the Assembly Elections 2014. He is the only Indian Army Officer to have attended and topped Staff College Camberley UK and the US Army War College.

Late Cadet Amit Raj sacrificed his own life while saving the lives of 3 kids was a tenth class student of Sainik School, Purulia and he belonged to Nalanda district of Bihar.

See also
Education in India
List of schools in India
Education in West Bengal

References

External links
 

Sainik schools
Boarding schools in West Bengal
Boys' schools in India
High schools and secondary schools in West Bengal
Schools in Purulia district
Educational institutions established in 1962
1962 establishments in West Bengal